Kaşıkçı is a village in the İdil District of Şırnak Province in Turkey. The village is populated by Kurds of the Dermemikan tribe and had a population of 204 in 2021.

The hamlet of Sivrice is attached to Kaşıkçı.

References 

Villages in İdil District
Kurdish settlements in Şırnak Province